Matsola Andriy Mykolayovych (born 4 August 1977, in Lviv) is a Ukrainian brewer, founder, owner and head of supervisory board of "Persha pryvatna brovarnya", a philanthropist, and a public figure.

Biography

Education 
He has a degree in economics. He graduated from Lviv college of finance and credit, and from Ternopyl academy of agriculture in 2001, and has a master's degree in "International economics". He is a student of Kyiv theological academy since 2012.

Professional experience 
He founded a distribution company named "Olmar" in 1998, which became one of the biggest beer distributing companies in western Ukraine in the middle of 2000. 
In 2002 he built a small experimental factory "Halytskiy brovar".  
In 2004 together with his family he has established "Persha pryvatna brovarnya". 
In 2007 "Persha pryvatna brovarnya" under the supervision of Andriy Matsola has become a participant of energy conservation program for small and medium business UKEEP and have received first investments from European bank of reconstruction and development in sum of 17,6 million USD. In 2012 EBRD together with German concern OETTINGER and OASIS CIS international group have entered to become the shareholders of the company.

Andriy Matsola is still the biggest shareholder of "Persha pryvatna brovarnya" and its executive director (CEO).

Social activity 
Since 2015 Andriy Matsola is the participant of "21st of November" initiative, the goal of which is actualization and generalization of values of modern Ukrainians.

Church and education support 
 Annually, under support of Andriy Matsola students of Kyiv and Volyn orthodox theological academies are forwarded to study in Aristotle University of Thessaloniki – the biggest educational institution of Greece.
 At the beginning of 2016 Andriy Matsola facilitated the appearance of Saint Sophia open orthodox university on the basis of Saint Sophia Cathedral national sanctuary.

Culture and art patronage 
 In May 2016, under the initiative of Andriy Matsola, "Persha Pryvatna Brovarnya" was a partner of "Kyiv city day.Holiday of free people" festival, which was held in the capital on the occasion of Kyiv city day.
 In June 2016, Andriy Matsola facilitated the organization of Oleh Skrypka and his band's "Vopli Vidoplyasova" concert tour at the frontline of ATO (Donetsk region, Ukraine). The musicians have played three concerts for the soldiers near Selidove, Mar'ynka and Kostiantynivka.

Sponsorship of sport 
 "Persha Pryvatna Brovarnya" is the official sponsor Biathlon federation of Ukraine since 2012.
 In 2015 Andriy Matsola had initiated to support the amateur sports in Ukraine.Today "Persha Pryvatna Brovarnya" company is the sponsor of the basketball team of "Kyiv-Mohyla Academy" University and football team "Katandzaro".

Partnership projects 
In 2015 "1+1" TV channel and "Persha pryvatna brovarnya" have launched a unique multimedia educating project "Moya krayina. Prekrasna I nezalezhna", which will demonstrate the most beautiful corners of Ukraine from bird fly height. Andriy Matsola together with "1+1" TV channel hosts Alla Mazur and other people are the faces of this project.

Personal life 
Married, parenting 4 sons.

References 
 Official page of Andriy Matsola on Facebook

Sources 

Businesspeople from Lviv
Ukrainian philanthropists
1977 births
Living people